Cubs may refer to:

The young of certain large predatory animals such as bears and big cats; analogous to a domestic puppy or kitten
Chicago Cubs, a baseball team of the National League of Major League Baseball (United States)
Iowa Cubs, a minor league baseball team of the Pacific Coast League
Daytona Cubs, the former name of the Daytona Tortugas, a minor league baseball team of the Florida State League
Arizona Complex League Cubs, a minor league baseball team of the Arizona League
Cub Scouts, a junior age group of the Scouting movement

Acronyms
Chinese University Basketball Super League (CUBS), former Chinese basketball league
Coventry University Business School in the United Kingdom

See also
Cub (disambiguation)